Gojače is a village on the edge of the Vipava Valley in the Municipality of Ajdovščina in the Littoral region of Slovenia.

Church

The church in the settlement is dedicated to Saint Justus and belongs to the Parish of Črniče. It contains paintings by the Baroque painter Anton Čebej.

References

External links 

Gojače at Geopedia

Populated places in the Municipality of Ajdovščina